Chunga's Revenge is the third solo album by Frank Zappa, released on October 23, 1970. Zappa's first effort of the 1970s marks the first appearance of former Turtles members Flo & Eddie on a Zappa record, and signals the dawn of a controversial epoch in Zappa's history. Chunga's Revenge represents a shift from both the satirical political commentary of his 1960s work with The Mothers of Invention, and the jazz fusion of Hot Rats.

Songs
The material presented on Chunga's Revenge is eclectic: side one includes a guitar jam ("Transylvania Boogie"), a bluesy amble ("Road Ladies"), a jazz interlude ("Twenty Small Cigars") and an avant garde live improvisation ("The Nancy and Mary Music") drawn from "King Kong" from a July 1970 Mothers performance, released officially on Road Tapes, Venue 3. Several poppy numbers ("Tell Me You Love Me", "Would You Go All the Way?", "Rudy Wants to Buy Yez a Drink", "Sharleena") appear on the second side along with the improvisational title track and a percussion-only track ("The Clap").

"Twenty Small Cigars" was drawn from the Hot Rats sessions from summer 1969. "Transylvania Boogie" and "Chunga's Revenge" come from the early 1970 period where Zappa performed with a band informally known as "Hot Rats," including Ian Underwood, Don "Sugarcane" Harris, Max Bennett and Aynsley Dunbar. Also from this period is "The Clap," a short multitracked percussion piece with Zappa as the only musician. The vocal tracks all deal with the subject of sex and/or groupie encounters and as Zappa notes on the sleeve of both the vinyl and CD, are a preview of the then forthcoming 200 Motels film/album, and date from the summer of 1970 after the formation of the new Mothers of Invention lineup.

The original early 1970 version of "Sharleena" later appeared on The Lost Episodes.

Other "lost" tracks from these sessions include the instrumentals "Twinkle Tits" and "Bognor Regis". A live version of "Twinkle Tits" is available on bootlegs, though the original studio version is not yet available. "Bognor Regis" was intended to be released as a B-side of "Sharleena", but the single was never released, and the track was leaked to the public on an acetate disc copy which made its way to the collector's market.

The title track was later recorded by Argentinian/Parisian tango revival group Gotan Project for their 2001 debut album La Revancha del Tango.

The guitar melody in "Tell Me You Love Me" is extremely similar to the one used in "Bwana Dik" and "Daddy, Daddy, Daddy", during the "if his dick is a monster" section, from Fillmore East - June 1971, and 200 Motels, respectively. Zappa would include a 1980 live version of the song on Tinsel Town Rebellion, while a 1988 version with revised lyrics titled "Why Don't You Like Me" appeared on Broadway the Hard Way. (A similar version from 1984, known as "Don't Be a Lawyer," has never been officially released.) Zappa would also include an 80's recording of "Sharleena" on Them or Us, while a 1988 version of "Chunga's Revenge" where Zappa played alongside his son Dweezil was the opening track of the album Trance-Fusion which Zappa compiled in the 90's (although it would not be released until 2006).

Critical reception 
Reviewing Chunga's Revenge in Christgau's Record Guide: Rock Albums of the Seventies (1981), Robert Christgau wrote: "Like Bobby Sherman, Zappa is a selfish exploiter of popular taste. That Bobby Sherman wants to make money while Zappa wants to make money and emulate Varese is beside the point—if anything, Zappa's aestheticism intensifies his contempt for rock and its audience. Even Hot Rats, his compositional peak, played as much with the moods and usages of Muzak as with those of rock and roll. This is definitely not his peak. Zappa plays a lot of guitar, just as his admirers always hope he will, but the overall effect is more Martin Denny than Varese. Also featured are a number of 'dirty' jokes."

Track listing

Personnel 
 Frank Zappa – guitar (except 8), vocals (2, 6, 9, 10), harpsichord (3), Condor (5), drums and percussions (8)
 Ian Underwood – organ (1), rhythm guitar (2, 5), piano (3), electric piano (4, 6, 9), alto saxophone (4), pipe organ (5), electric alto saxophone with wah-wah pedal (7), tenor saxophone and grand piano (10)
 Aynsley Dunbar – drums (except 3, 8), tambourine (9)
 John Guerin – drums (3)
 Max Bennett – bass (1, 3, 7)
 Jeff Simmons – bass (2, 4, 5, 6, 9, 10), vocals (2, 4, 9, 10)
 George Duke – organ (2, 10), electric piano (4, 5), vocal sound effects (4), trombone (6, 9)
 Howard Kaylan – vocals (2, 4, 5, 6, 9, 10)
 Mark Volman – vocals (2, 4, 5, 6, 9, 10), rhythm guitar (9)
 Don "Sugarcane" Harris – organ (7)

Production 
 Producer: Frank Zappa
 Engineers: Stan Agol, Roy Baker, Dick Kunc, Bruce Margolis
 Production assistant: Dick Barber
 Arranger: Frank Zappa
 Cover design: Cal Schenkel
 Illustrations: Cal Schenkel
 Photography: Phil Franks (front cover) and John Williams

Charts

References

External links 
 Lyrics and information

1970 albums
Albums produced by Frank Zappa
Bizarre Records albums
Frank Zappa albums
Reprise Records albums
Albums recorded at Trident Studios